Teen Mom (renamed Teen Mom OG from the fifth season) is an American reality television series broadcast by MTV. It is the first spin-off of 16 and Pregnant, and it focuses on the lives of several young mothers as they navigate motherhood and strained family and romantic relationships. Its first run consists of four seasons originally aired between December 8, 2009, and October 9, 2012, while another four seasons have aired during its second run that began on March 23, 2015.

Series overview

Episodes

Season 1 (2009–10)

Season 2 (2010)

Season 3 (2011)

Season 4 (2012)

Season 5 (2015–16)

Season 6 (2016–17)

Season 7 (2017–18)

Season 8 (2019–20)

Season 9 (2021)

Specials

References

External links

Official Show Website

Lists of American non-fiction television series episodes